Fremantle Railway Bridge (known also as the North Fremantle Bridge) is the railway bridge on the Fremantle railway line that crosses the Swan River between Fremantle and North Fremantle. It is the second structure with that name.

The original bridge was of concern due to its structure, as well as its position limiting the eastern extent of the Fremantle Harbour.

The current bridge is further up stream and closer to the Fremantle Traffic Bridge than the earlier lower structure, and was being planned in the 1950s.

1926 floods 

In 1926 the earlier bridge were destroyed by floods, and was re-built soon after.

2000s damage 
The current bridge was damaged in the 2000s by ships hitting the bridge, one during a storm, but was repairable. It now has barriers to prevent further events.

References

External links

Fremantle Harbour
Swan River (Western Australia)
Fremantle line
Railway bridges in Western Australia